Heidelberg is a town in Jasper County, Mississippi, United States. The population was 718 at the 2010 census, down from 840 at the 2000 census.

Geography
Heidelberg is located in southeastern Jasper County at  (31.891249, -88.990952). The town limits extend northwest to encompass Exit 113 on Interstate 59. U.S. Route 11, running parallel to I-59, crosses the southeastern corner of the town. Both highways lead northeast  to Meridian and southwest  to Laurel.

Beaver Creek, a tributary of Bogue Homo, runs through the town. Via Bogue Homo, the town is part of the Leaf River and thence the Pascagoula River watershed.

The area around Heidelberg has abundant natural resources, including nearby oil and gas reserves. Jasper County is the highest producer of oil in Mississippi.

Demographics

2020 census

As of the 2020 United States census, there were 637 people, 269 households, and 220 families residing in the town.

2000 census
As of the census of 2000, there were 840 people, 320 households, and 224 families residing in the town. The population density was 164.3 people per square mile (63.5/km2). There were 359 housing units at an average density of 70.2 per square mile (27.1/km2). The racial makeup of the town was 73.33% African American, 26.31% White and 0.36% from two or more races. Hispanic or Latino of any race were 0.36% of the population.

There were 320 households, out of which 29.4% had children under the age of 18 living with them, 40.6% were married couples living together, 25.6% had a female householder with no husband present, and 29.7% were non-families. 27.5% of all households were made up of individuals, and 14.4% had someone living alone who was 65 years of age or older. The average household size was 2.63 and the average family size was 3.19.

In the town, the population was spread out, with 26.5% under the age of 18, 9.5% from 18 to 24, 22.5% from 25 to 44, 22.5% from 45 to 64, and 18.9% who were 65 years of age or older. The median age was 38 years. For every 100 females, there were 81.4 males. For every 100 females age 18 and over, there were 75.8 males.

The median income for a household in the town was $21,063, and the median income for a family was $27,768. Males had a median income of $25,982 versus $16,667 for females. The per capita income for the town was $13,555. About 23.0% of families and 25.0% of the population were below the poverty line, including 29.9% of those under age 18 and 25.5% of those age 65 or over.

Education
Heidelberg is served by the East Jasper School District.

 Heidelberg High School 
 Heidelberg Junior High School 
 The New William J. Berry Elementary School

Defunct school

 Heidelberg Academy (1971–2016). It closed its doors after the 2015-2016 year due to financial difficulties. Former students' school records are stored at Sylva-Bay Academy,  to the west in Bay Springs.

Notable people
 Hamp King, State Auditor of Mississippi from 1964 to 1984
 E. Wilson Lyon, sixth president of Pomona College
 Freddie Parker, former running back in the National Football League

References

External links
 

Towns in Jasper County, Mississippi
Towns in Mississippi
Towns in Laurel micropolitan area